Senator Draheim may refer to:

Rich Draheim (fl. 1980s–2010s), Minnesota State Senate
William Draheim (1898–1976), Wisconsin State Senate